Barton is a village in Gloucestershire, on the Windrush River, near Naunton.  It appears in written records as Berton as early as 1287.

References

External links

Villages in Gloucestershire
Temple Guiting